Iván López may refer to:
 Iván López (singer) (born 1985), Mexican reality show singer
 Iván López (swimmer) (born 1984), Mexican swimmer
 Iván López (runner) (born 1990), Chilean middle-distance runner
 Iván López Álvarez (born 1994), Spanish footballer
 Iván López (footballer, born 1978), Colombian defender
 Iván López (footballer, born 1990), Honduran midfielder
 Iván López (footballer, born 1993), Spanish defender
 Iván López (footballer, born 1996), Argentine goalkeeper
 Iván López (actor) (born 1980), Colombian television actor
 Ivan A. Lopez, Puerto Rican perpetrator of the 2014 Fort Hood shootings
 Iván López, Mexican mixed martial arts fighter, see WEC 40

See also
 Ivan (disambiguation)
 López (surname)